Leirvassbu is a staffed lodge with hut of the Norwegian Trekking Association (In Norwegian, Den Norske Turistforening – DNT) located in the Leirdal in the county Oppland in the middle of Norway.

The hut is located about 1400 meters above sea level in the high mountains Jotunheimen. Several walks are possible. It is located at the end of a side road off Norwegian County Road 55, the Sognefjellsvegen, just before Lake Bøvertunvatnet.

Surrounding places are Bøvertun, Krossbu and Elveseter.

External links
 Leirvassbu
 Leirvassbu
 Norwegian Trekking Association Leirvassbu

Tourist huts in Norway
Jotunheimen